Ulrich Wehling (born 8 July 1952 in Halle) is a retired German skier who won the nordic combined event in the Winter Olympics three consecutive times, in 1972, 1976, and 1980. Wehling was the first man to win three consecutive gold medals in the same event at Winter Olympics but not the first Olympian to win three Gold in a winter discipline as Gillis Grafström had won a figure skating title at the Summer Olympics 1920 before winning twice at the first two Winter Olympics.

At the FIS Nordic World Ski Championships, Wehling won two Nordic combined medals with a gold in 1974 and a bronze in 1978. Wehling also won the Nordic combined at the Holmenkollen ski festival three straight years (1975–1977). For his successes in the Nordic combined, he received the Holmenkollen medal in 1976. He was a Stasi informer under the codename "Springer".

Wehling is currently FIS Race Director for the Nordic combined, a role he also did for the 2006 Winter Olympics in Turin and the FIS Nordic World Ski Championships 2007 in Sapporo. He now lives in Switzerland.

Other successes
 1971 junior European champion
 1975 GDR masters
 1976 GDR master
 1977 GDR master
 1978 GDR master
 1979 GDR master

Citations

References
 FIS Official listings
 
 Holmenkollen medalists - click Holmenkollmedaljen for downloadable pdf file 
 Holmenkollen winners since 1892 - click Vinnere for downloadable pdf file 

1952 births
Living people
Nordic combined skiers at the 1972 Winter Olympics
Nordic combined skiers at the 1976 Winter Olympics
Nordic combined skiers at the 1980 Winter Olympics
German male Nordic combined skiers
Holmenkollen medalists
Holmenkollen Ski Festival winners
Olympic Nordic combined skiers of East Germany
Olympic gold medalists for East Germany
Sportspeople from Halle (Saale)
Olympic medalists in Nordic combined
FIS Nordic World Ski Championships medalists in Nordic combined
Medalists at the 1976 Winter Olympics
Medalists at the 1980 Winter Olympics
Medalists at the 1972 Winter Olympics
Recipients of the Patriotic Order of Merit
People of the Stasi